Soldiers of Fortune is a lost 1919 American silent drama film directed by Allan Dwan and starring Wallace Beery. The film is based on the 1897 novel of the same name by Richard Harding Davis. The film was produced by the Mayflower Photoplay Company Richard Harding Davis's novel that inspired the film had already been brought to the screen in 1914 by William F. Haddock; that version of Soldiers of Fortune starred Dustin Farnum. The subject of both the 1914 and 1919 films are based on the Spanish–American War. The 1919 film was shot on the San Diego Fairgrounds at Balboa Park in San Diego, California. Distributed by Realart Pictures, the film was released in American theaters on November 22, 1919.

Plot
Robert Clay, a noble America hero of humble means trying to do his best to help the war effort in the fictional capital Olancho in a small South American republic, but he meets a rich lady and they fall in love during the revolution. Robert Clay is the engineer and general manager of the Valencia Mining Company in Olancho. There are two sisters that come into Robert Clay's life. Both are the daughters of Mr. Langham, the president of the Mining company. The older sister, Alice, is a New York City society girl. Her sister Hope is enthusiastic, generous and sweet. Robert Clay meets Alice just before he sails for South America. He shares  his admiration for her. Later, when he learns the family are going to Olancho also, he is very happy. But after getting to know Alice better he is sad. During her visit to Olancho a revolution starts, in this time she shows courage and to be a lady of charter. This attracts Clay to her, he ask her to marry him.

Cast
 Wallace Beery as Mendoza
 Ogden Crane as Burke
 Ward Crane as Reginald King
 Norman Kerry as Robert Clay
 Fred Kohler as McWilliams
 Herold Lindsay as Mrs. Alvarez
 Wilfred Lucas as President Alvarez
 Melbourne MacDowell as Mr. Langham
 Philo McCullough as Captain Stuart
 Anna Q. Nilsson as Alice Langham
 Pauline Starke as Hope Langham
 Frank Wally as Teddy Langham

Film stills and ads

References

External links
 
 
 
 Pryor, Arthur Willard (1920), "Soldiers of Fortune March" (written for the film)

1919 films
1919 drama films
Silent American drama films
American silent feature films
American black-and-white films
Lost American films
Films directed by Allan Dwan
Films set in South America
Films based on American novels
Remakes of American films
1919 lost films
Lost drama films
1910s American films
1910s English-language films